Daniela Luján (born Daniela Barrios Rodriguez, 5 April 1988) is a Mexican pop singer and actress. She is considered the "Queen of Telenovelas for Children" for having starred in telenovelas of world success, being: Luz Clarita and El diario de Daniela. She got prominence in Una familia de diez, playing Gabriela "Gaby" del Valle de López, Sortilegio, playing Lisette Albarrán and De que te quiero, te quiero, playing Karina Montiel, projects that marked her transition and artistic maturity. In her musical career, some critics call her Princess of Cumbia.

Biography

Born on 5 April 1988, to Miguel Barrios Luján and Amalia Rodríguez Gómez, she is the youngest of three daughters.
She started her artistic career at the age of five when she played on the show Plaza Sésamo (the Mexican version of Sesame Street). She shot to fame in 1996 with the telenovela Luz Clarita, where Daniela played the main character, seven-year-old Luz Clarita. Daniela went on to star in other telenovelas like El diario de Daniela and Primer amor... a mil por hora. She has released two solo albums, one in 1999 titled Por un mundo mejor ("For a better world") and the other in 2001 titled Corazón.com ("Heart.com").

In 2004, she signed a contract with Menudo creator Edgardo Díaz, who is now in charge of her singing career.

In February 2017, she returned to Univision to become the captain of Pequeños Gigantes USA.

Filmography

Television

Stage
En El 2000, El Musical Del Nuevo Milenio ... Anahí/Renata (2019-2020)
Cosas de Papá y Mamá ... Luisa (2018)
La Princesa y el Ministro ... Princesa (2018)
La Estética del Crimen ... Bárbara Lláñes (2018)
La Tiendita de los Horrores ... Audrey Fulquard (2017)
Verdad O Reto (2016)
Carrie El Musical (2016)
Una Familia de Diez (2014-2016)
Cenicienta el musical (2010) Teatro Libanés
Wicked (2010) ... Nessarose
Camisa de fuerza (2009–2010)
Cuentos para un día de sol (2009)
Radio patito (2009)
Vaselina (Mexican version of Grease) (2006) ... Licha/Sonia
Centella, tierra de magia y estrellas (2005) ... Princesa Catite
En dónde está el Mago de Oz
Ariel, una historia de mar
Caperucita Roja ... Caperucita Roja
El sueño de una Flor

Film
Sobre Tus Huellas - Carolina (2020)
Charming - Lenore - (Voice - Latin Dub) (2019)
Trolls - DJ Suki - (Voice - Latin Dub) (2016)
Angelito Mio - María De Las Estrellas (1998)
Entre Pancho Villa y Una Mujer Desnuda - Danny - (Participation) (1995)

Host
Lifetime Fashion Studio (2018)
¡Qué Rayos! (2017-2018)
Bailadísimo Junior (2017)
TV de noche... desde la tarde (2012)
Ritmo y Sabor (2004)
Generación del Milenio (2002)
Alebrije Kids (2002)

Discography

Albums

Soundtracks
1997: La Luz más Clarita
1999: Angelito mío
1999: El diario de Daniela
2002: Cómplices al rescate, el gran final

References

External links
 Official Site
 Official Youtube Channel

1988 births
Living people
Mexican child actresses
Mexican telenovela actresses
Singers from Mexico City
Portuguese-language singers of Mexico
Actresses from Mexico City
Mexican people of Spanish descent
21st-century Mexican singers
21st-century Mexican women singers
Women in Latin music